The House of Mitre Gjozinski and Velimir Čangovski, is a historical house in Galičnik that is listed as Cultural heritage of North Macedonia. It is in ownership of the families of Gjozinski and Čangovski.

Family history

Members of the families 
 Boris Gjozinski - member of the Communist Party of Yugoslavia

References

External links
 National Register of objects that are cultural heritage (List updated to December 31, 2012) (In Macedonian)
 Office for Protection of Cultural Heritage (In Macedonian)

Historic houses
Cultural heritage of North Macedonia
Galičnik